"Home" is a song by American rapper and singer Machine Gun Kelly, American rock band X Ambassadors and American singer-songwriter Bebe Rexha. The song was sent to radio on December 5, 2017 by Atlantic Records as the second single from the Netflix film Bright. The song makes Bright director David Ayer's second film to feature X Ambassadors on its soundtrack, following "Sucker for Pain" from the 2016 film Suicide Squad.  The song also gained popularity in the NASCAR fandom, with Youtuber KingKyleBusch releasing a music video focused on rising star Chase Elliott.

The song peaked at No. 74 in Australia, No. 43 in Canada, and No. 90 on the US Billboard Hot 100. The music video was released on YouTube on November 23, 2017, a month before the film was released.

Track listing

Charts

Certifications

Release history

References

External links
 

2017 singles
2017 songs
Machine Gun Kelly (musician) songs
X Ambassadors songs
Bebe Rexha songs
Bright (franchise)
Songs written by Machine Gun Kelly (musician)
Atlantic Records singles
Songs written by David Pramik